Pam Sporn is a filmmaker and teacher. Her documentaries have won several film festival awards.

Career
Her work has covered such topics as Cuban cigar rollers, an annual dance, and the story of a family that emigrated from Cuba to the United States, as well as "homelessness, teen pregnancy and police brutality."

Films
 "Disobeying Orders: GI Resistance to the Vietnam War"
 "Cuban Roots, Bronx Stories"
 "Con El Toque de la Chavetta" ("With the Stroke of the Chavetta")
 "Recordando El Mamoncillo" ("Remembering the Mamoncillo Tree")
 "Detroit 48202: Conversations Along a Postal Route"

Awards
 1997 BRIO award
 2007 BRIO award
 2008 Cine Las Americas International Film Festival's Jury Award for Best Documentary Short for "Con El Toque de la Chavetta" ("With the Stroke of the Chavetta")
 2010 BRIO award

References

External links
 

Living people
Film directors from New York City
Place of birth missing (living people)
Year of birth missing (living people)